Belauri, The former  village development committee was converted into Municipality merging with existing Rampur Bilaspur, Laxmipur, Mahakali and Sripur village development committee on 18 May 2014. At the time of the 1991 Nepal census it had a population of 14,280 people living in 1877 individual households.

References

Populated places in Kanchanpur District
Nepal municipalities established in 2014
Municipalities in Kanchanpur District